The People's Electoral Movement (MEP) is a social democratic political party in Aruba. 
following the 2001 general election for the Parliament of Aruba the party won 52.4% of popular vote and 12 out of 21 seats. in the 2005 general election, the party won 43% of the popular vote and 11 out of 21 seats thus won the election and remained in power. in the 2009 general election, MEP lost 2 seats and won 36% of the vote, subsequently losing the election.

In the 2017 general election. The MEP won 37% of the vote, and gained a seat, following the appointment of a formateur, The MEP agreed to form a Coalition government with Pueblo Orguyoso y Respeta (POR) and Network of Electoral Democracy (RED).

Following the 2021 Aruban general election, the MEP remained the largest party in Parliament and went on subsequently to form a minority government.

Notable members
 Betico Croes, political activist who played a major role in Aruba's separation of the Netherlands Antilles
 Nelson Oduber, 2nd Prime Minister of Aruba
 Frans Figaroa, former Lieutenant Governor and Speaker of the Parliament of the Netherlands Antilles
 Evelyn Wever-Croes, incumbent Prime Minister of Aruba

References

External links

Former member parties of the Socialist International
Political parties in Aruba
1971 establishments in the Netherlands Antilles
Political parties established in 1971